Bambusa polymorpha, or Burmese bamboo, is a species of clumping bamboo native to Bangladesh, Laos, Myanmar, Thailand, Sri Lanka, Java, Cuba, Puerto Rico, and Ecuador.

Habit
It is a tall, grayish green colored bamboo species, which grows in thickets consisting of a large number of heavily branched, closely growing culms. It reaches a height of 10–30 m.

Appearance
Culms are green, covered with whitish brown hair, and become brownish green when drying. Young shoots are greenish brown in color. Branching occurs from the mid-culm to the top. Aerial roots reach up to few nodes above ground.

Young culm sheaths are greenish, which become yellowish brown when mature. Sheaths of growing shoots are golden yellow color, with cup-shaped blades. The sheath proper is 20–25 cm in length and 28–35 cm wide. Blade length is 5–10 cm. Auricles are equal, sickle-shaped, wavy, and curled. Upper surfaces of the sheaths are covered with brownish-black, closely pressed hairs. Lower surfaces of the sheaths are not hairy. Sheaths do not fall early, but blades fall.

Uses
In India, it is used for walls, partitions, troughs, and mats. In Myanmar, it is used for making house frames, wattle-and-daub walls, partitions, concrete reinforcement, and ceilings.

References

Flowers India
The Plant List

polymorpha
Flora of Asia